The 2015 Persipasi Bandung Raya season was the 26th season in the club's football history and the 3rd season competing in the Indonesia Super League as Pelita Bandung Raya.

Review and events 
They will play their home matches at Patriot Stadium. The 2015 Indonesia Super League was officially discontinued by PSSI on May 2, 2015 due to a ban by Imam Nahrawi, Minister of Youth and Sports Affairs, against PSSI to run any football competition.

Matches

Legend

Friendlies

Indonesia Super League

Squad 
Sources:

|}

Transfers

In

Out

Notes 

1.Kickoff time in UTC+07:00.
2.Kickoff time in UTC+08:00.
3.Kickoff time in UTC+09:00.
4.Persipasi Bandung Raya's goals first.

Sources

External links 
 2015 Pelita Bandung Raya season at ligaindonesia.co.id 
 2015 Pelita Bandung Raya season at soccerway.com

Persipasi Bandung Raya
Persipasi Bandung Raya
Persipasi Bandung Raya seasons